Pseudomacrochenus oberthueri is a species of beetle in the family Cerambycidae. It was described by Stephan von Breuning in 1955. It is known from China.

References

Lamiini
Beetles described in 1955
Taxa named by Stephan von Breuning (entomologist)